The 2S7 Pion ("peony") or Malka is a Soviet self-propelled 203mm cannon. "2S7" is its GRAU designation. More than 250 units were built; some sources say 500, others up to 1,000. They were distributed around the former Soviet states in the dissolution of the Soviet Union after 1991.

Description
The 2S7 Pion was identified for the first time in 1975 in the Soviet Army and was called M-1975 by NATO (the 2S4 Tyulpan also received the M-1975 designation), whereas its official designation is SO-203 (2S7). It used a new-design chassis, partly based on T-72 and T-80 design, carrying an externally mounted 2A44 203 mm gun on the hull rear. The vehicle is self-entrenching and has an overpressure CBRN defense system.

There are multiple manufacturers: the chassis was made at the Kirov Factory, St. Petersburg, Russia, while the gun and mount were made at the Titan-Barrikady plant in Volgograd, Russia.

The Malka modernization process in the late 2010s involved substituting several of the Ukrainian-produced components, such as the gearbox and engine, with new components manufactured in Russia at the Uraltransmash plant in Yekaterinburg. The gun can fire the Kleshchevina nuclear shell.

The 2S7 uses a tracked chassis that was designed specifically for this artillery system. It uses a number of automotive components from the T-72 and T-80 main battle tanks. It is powered by a V-46-I turbocharged liquid-cooled V12 diesel engine, developing 750 horsepower (or 840). It is also fitted with an auxiliary power unit, developing 24 hp and powering all systems when the main engine is shut down.

The 2S7 carries a crew of fourteen; seven are carried by the Pion and seven in an auxiliary vehicle.

It takes the crew about six minutes to set up and five minutes to dismantle. It carries four 203 mm projectiles for immediate use. It is capable of firing nuclear ammunition. One interesting feature of the Pion is the firing alarm. Because the blast of the weapon firing is so powerful – it can physically incapacitate an unprepared soldier or crew member near it from concussive force – the Pion is equipped with an audible firing alarm that emits a series of short warning tones for approximately five seconds prior to the charge being fired.

The system carries four rounds of ammunition; four more rounds are carried by the support vehicle. This makes the 2S7 less susceptible to counter-battery fire from an enemy with a counter-battery radar such as ARTHUR.

Operational and combat history
The 2S7 was first used in combat by the Soviet Union in Soviet–Afghan War (1979–1989)
Russian forces used it in the First and Second Chechen Wars (First war: 1994–1996, Second war: 1999–2009)
The Georgian Army used 2S7s in the Russo-Georgian War in 2008 (7–16 August 2008), six of which were captured by Russian forces
2S7s were brought back into service by the Ukrainian army during the war in Donbas in late 2014, and were used in combat just outside the 'buffer' zone stipulated by the Minsk Protocol, as they had long enough range to still provide artillery support.
The Russian armed forces are reinforcing their artillery forces, reactivating 2S7M Malka 203 mm self-propelled howitzers (SPHs) and 2S4 Tyulpan 240 mm self-propelled mortars. The upgraded 2S7M SPH is linked to the modernised 1V12M command vehicle, which uses a GLONASS navigation unit.
Video released by the Azerbaijan Ministry of Defence showed their 2S7s in use during the 2020 Nagorno-Karabakh war.
The 2S7 has been pictured moving towards the border with Ukraine during the 2021–2022 Russo-Ukrainian crisis.
It was used by Ukrainian Forces during the 2022 Russian invasion of Ukraine as early as 25 February 2022.
It was used by Russian Forces during the Russo-Ukrainian War, as reported in Newsweek on 27 May 2022.

Variants
The original version is known as the 2S7 Pion.

An updated version called the 2S7M Malka entered service in either 1983 or 1986. The 2S7M Malka uses an improved fire control system that increased the rate of fire from 1.5 to 2.5 rounds per minute, and increased the ammunition load to eight projectiles.

The BTM-4 Tundra trench digger shares the 2S7 Pion chassis.

Operators

Although no figures have been released, it is estimated that well over 1,000 have been built. The Soviet Army had 347 in active service as of 1990.
  – 12, acquired in 2000 from the Czech Republic
  – at least 12, acquired from Russia in 2008–2009
  – 36 in reserve
 
  – 60 2S7M in active service, 260 2S7 in reserve as of 2022. Modernisation with new running gear and electronics completed as of December 2021.
  – 99, brought from reserve and restored to active service due to the war in Donbas and ongoing Russian invasion of Ukraine.

Former operators
  – 12 vehicles operated by 17th Large Caliber Artillery Division in Žamberk, 1984–1994. One machine is kept in Military museum Lešany.
  – passed on to successor states

See also
 2B1 Oka
 2A3 Kondensator 2P
 180 mm gun S-23
 240 mm mortar M240
 M110 howitzer

References

External links

 The Global Security 2S7 Pion webpage has more details than can be presented here.

Self-propelled artillery of the Soviet Union
Self-propelled artillery of Russia
203 mm artillery
Military vehicles introduced in the 1970s